Circular procurement is an approach that recognises the role that private and public authorities can play in supporting the transition towards a circular economy. Circular procurement can be defined as the process by which private or public authorities purchase works, goods or services that seek to contribute to closed energy and material loops within supply chains, whilst minimising, and in the best case avoiding, negative environmental impacts and waste creation across their whole life-cycle. As a concept it builds on Sustainable Procurement, adding elements such as closed-loop material use.

Policy context 
The EU Action Plan for the Circular Economy has established an ambitious programme of action which will help to ‘close the loop’ of product lifecycles. This plan recognises public procurement as a key driver in the transition towards the circular economy, and it sets out several actions which the European Commission will take to facilitate the integration of circular economy principles in GPP. These include highlighting circular aspects in new or updated sets of EU GPP Criteria.

Circular public procurement also has a role to play in achieving the Sustainable Development Goals, defined by the United Nations 2030 Agenda for Sustainable Development. Especially, SDG 12 - Responsible Consumption and Production – includes a specific target on promoting public procurement practices that are sustainable, in accordance with national policies and priorities.
Furthermore, several countries, regions, and cities have been developing their own circular strategies in which public procurement is often emphasized as key mechanism for scaling up the transition to a circular economy.

Three Levels of Circular Procurement 
There are three types or ‘levels’ of models for implementing circular procurement:

 ‘System level’: concerns the contractual methods that the purchasing organisation can use to ensure circularity. For example, supplier take-back agreements or product service systems
 ‘Supplier level’: how suppliers can build circularity into their own systems and processes, in order to ensure the products and services they offer meet circular procurement criteria.
 ‘Product level’: focused solely on the products that suppliers to public authorities may themselves procure further down the supply chain.

Benefits 
As an addition to sustainable procurement, circularity can help buyers take a more comprehensive approach - from the first stages of a procurement to the end of product life – while also achieving financial benefits. A circular economy will retain materials at their highest value, push for innovation and support local employment markets. By 2025, at a global scale, it has an estimated potential to add $1 trillion to the global economy and create 100,000 new jobs within the next five years.

References

Further reading

Environmental economics